Stén Knuth (born 15 December 1964 in Slagelse) is a Danish politician who is a member of the Folketing for the Venstre political party. He was elected into parliament in the 2019 Danish general election.

Knuth has been in the municipal council of Slagelse Municipality since 2006 and was the mayor from 2014 to 2017. He was elected into parliament in the 2019 election.

References

External links 
 Biography on the website of the Danish Parliament (Folketinget)

1964 births
Living people
Danish municipal councillors
Mayors of places in Denmark
People from Slagelse
Venstre (Denmark) politicians
Members of the Folketing 2019–2022